Svetlana Aleksandrovna Metkina (born 7 January 1974) is a Russian actress from Moscow. She is known outside Russia for playing the Czechoslovak reporter Lenka Janáček in the 2006 film Bobby. She is known in Hollywood under the name Lana Litvak. She also co-produced "The guilty" that stars Jake Gyllenhaal.

Filmography

Film

Television

External links 
 
 Interview in Izvestiya 

1974 births
Living people
Actresses from Moscow
Russian film actresses